José Ascención Orihuela Bárcenas (born 19 March 1952) is a Mexican politician affiliated with the Institutional Revolutionary Party. He currently serves as Senator of the LXII Legislature of the Mexican Congress representing Michoacán. He also served as Senator during the LVII Legislature and as Deputy during the LV and LX Legislature, as well as a local deputy in the Congress of Michoacán.

References

1952 births
Living people
Politicians from Michoacán
People from Zitácuaro
Members of the Senate of the Republic (Mexico)
Members of the Chamber of Deputies (Mexico)
Institutional Revolutionary Party politicians
21st-century Mexican politicians
Instituto Politécnico Nacional alumni
Members of the Congress of Michoacán
20th-century Mexican politicians
Municipal presidents in Michoacán